Queen Elizabeth, Queen Elisabeth or Elizabeth the Queen may refer to:

Queens regnant 
 Elizabeth I (1533–1603), Queen of England and Ireland
 Elizabeth II (1926–2022), Queen of the United Kingdom and other Commonwealth realms
 Queen Betty (reign began  1686; died either  1708 or  1723 as Queen Ann (Pamunkey chief)),  (chief) of the Pamunkey tribe

Queens regent 

 Elizabeth the Cuman (1239/1240–1290), queen consort and regent of Hungary
 Elizabeth of Carinthia, Queen of Sicily (1298–1352), queen consort and regent of Sicily
 Elizabeth of Poland, Queen of Hungary (1305–1380), queen consort of Hungary, regent of Poland
 Elizabeth Kīnaʻu (c. 1805–1839), queen consort, queen regent and dowager queen of Hawai'i

Queens consort

Bohemia, Hungary, and Poland
Elizabeth the Cuman (1244–1290), queen consort of Hungary
Elizabeth of Sicily, Queen of Hungary (1261–1303), queen consort of Hungary
Elizabeth Richeza of Poland (1286–1335), queen consort of Bohemia and Poland
Elizabeth of Bohemia (1292–1330), queen consort of Bohemia
Elizabeth of Bosnia (1339–1387), queen consort and queen dowager of Hungary and Poland, queen mother of Hungary
Elizabeth Granowska (c. 1372 – 1420), queen consort of Poland
Elizabeth of Austria (1436–1505), queen consort, queen dowager and queen mother of Poland
Elizabeth of Austria (1526–1545), queen consort of Poland
Elizabeth Stuart, Queen of Bohemia (1596–1662), the "Winter Queen", briefly queen consort of Bohemia
Elisabeth of Bavaria (1837–1898), queen consort of Hungary, Croatia, and Bohemia

Castile and Leon, Portugal, and Spain
Elisabeth of Swabia (1205–1235), also known as Beatrice of Swabia, queen consort of Castile and León
Elizabeth of Portugal (1271–1336), also known as Saint Elizabeth of Portugal, queen consort of Portugal
Elisabeth of Valois (1545–1568), queen consort of Spain
Elisabeth of France (1602–1644), queen consort of Spain and Portugal
Elisabeth Farnese (1692–1766), queen consort, queen dowager and queen mother of Spain
Louise Élisabeth d'Orléans (1709–1742), queen consort of Spain

England, Scotland, and the United Kingdom 

Elizabeth de Burgh (1289–1327), queen consort of Scotland
Elizabeth Woodville (1437–1492), queen consort, queen dowager and queen mother of England
Elizabeth of York (1466–1503), queen consort of England
Elizabeth Bowes-Lyon (1900–2002), queen consort, queen dowager and queen mother of the United Kingdom and the British Dominions

France
Elisabeth of Bavaria-Ingolstadt or Isabeau of Bavaria (c. 1370 – 1435), queen consort of France
Elisabeth of Austria, Queen of France (1554–1592), queen consort of France

Germany
Elisabeth of Bavaria, Queen of Germany (c. 1227 – 1273), queen consort of Germany, Jerusalem and Sicily
Elisabeth of Carinthia, Queen of the Romans (c. 1262 – 1312), queen consort of Germany
Elizabeth of Pomerania (1347–1393), queen consort and queen dowager of the Romans, Bohemia, Italy and Burgundy
Elisabeth of Nuremberg (1358–1411), queen consort of the Romans
Elizabeth of Luxembourg (1409–1442), queen consort of the Romans, Hungary, Bohemia and Croatia

Prussia
Elisabeth Christine of Brunswick-Wolfenbüttel-Bevern (1715–1797), queen consort and queen dowager of Prussia
Elisabeth Ludovika of Bavaria (1801–1873), queen consort of Prussia

Other countries 

 Elisiv of Kiev (1025–c. 1067), also known as Elisaveta Yaroslavna, queen consort of Norway
 Elizabeth of Hungary, Queen of Serbia (1255–1313), queen consort of Serbia
 Elizabeth of Holstein-Rendsburg (c. 1300 – before 1340), junior queen consort of Denmark
 Elisabeth Therese of Lorraine (1711–1741), queen consort of Sardinia, Cyprus, Jerusalem and Armenia
 Elisabeth of Wied (1843–1916), queen consort and queen dowager of Romania
 Elisabeth of Bavaria, Queen of the Belgians (1876–1965), queen consort, queen dowager, and queen mother of the Belgians
 Elisabeth of Romania (1894–1956), queen consort of the Hellenes

Ships
 HMS Queen Elizabeth, several ships of the Royal Navy
 MS Queen Elizabeth, Cunard cruise ship launched in 2010
 RMS Queen Elizabeth, Cunard ocean liner launched 1938, retired 1968
 Queen Elizabeth 2, Cunard ocean liner launched in 1969, retired 2008
 Queen Elizabeth-class (disambiguation), several classes of ships

Arts and media
 Queen Elizabeth (band), a British experimental music project featuring Thighpaulsandra and Julian Cope
 Les Amours de la reine Élisabeth (Queen Elizabeth), a 1912 film starring Sarah Bernhardt
 Elizabeth the Queen (play), a 1930 play by Maxwell Anderson
Elizabeth the Queen (film), a 1968 TV movie

Fictional characters 

Elizabeth III of Manticore, character in David Weber's Honorverse books
 Elizabeth X, queen of Starship UK in the Doctor Who episode "The Beast Below"

Other uses
 Queen Elizabeth, Saskatoon, a suburban neighborhood in the city of Saskatoon, Saskatchewan, Canada
 Queen Elizabeth Hotel, a hotel in Montreal, Quebec, Canada, known as Le Reine Élizabeth
 Queen Liz (criminal), a 19th-century American criminal
 Queen Elizabeth II Centre, a conference facility in the City of Westminster

See also

 
 
 
 
 List of things named after Elizabeth II
 Queen Isabella (disambiguation)